Attabiyeh may refer to:
 Attabiyeh-ye Jonubi
 Attabiyeh-ye Shomali